Ram Dutt Joshi (16 November 1916 – 26 December 1976) was an Indian bishop of the United Methodist Church, elected in 1968.  He was born in Dwarahat, Uttarakhand state of northern India. Prior to his election to the episcopacy, Joshi served with distinction as a pastor, district superintendent, seminary professor, and educational secretary.

Joshi was elected a bishop by the Southern Asia Central Conference of the U.M. Church. He was assigned to the Bombay Episcopal Area. A biographer says he "was a thoughtful man, with a gift for analysing situations. In dialogue groups he was noted for his calm, pertinent contributions.  He was broad in his sympathies and fully devoted to seeing the church in India fulfil its destiny".

Bishop Joshi died at the time of the Central Conference meeting in Lucknow.

See also
List of bishops of the United Methodist Church
Kumaoni people

References 

Indian religion academics
Methodist theologians
1916 births
1976 deaths
Indian United Methodist bishops
People from Almora district